The Men's 50 km freestyle mass start was the final event of the FIS Nordic World Ski Championships 2011. It was held at 6 March 2011 at 13:00 CET. Norway's Petter Northug is both the defending world and Olympic champion.

Results

References

FIS Nordic World Ski Championships 2011